CITIC Limited is a conglomerate headquartered in Hong Kong. Its shares are listed on the Main Board of the Hong Kong Stock Exchange, and it is a constituent of the Hang Seng Index. 58% of its issued shares are owned by the Chinese state-owned CITIC Group.

It is principally engaged in financial services, resources and energy, manufacturing, engineering contracting, real estate and other businesses.

Business areas

CITIC Limited previously known as CITIC Pacific is a diversified company with a primary focus on special steel manufacturing, property and iron ore mining, which supplies the raw material needed in the making of special steel and property development in mainland China. CITIC Pacific's operating segments include special steel, iron ore mining, property, civil infrastructure, power generation and other business areas. CITIC Pacific's subsidiaries include CITIC Pacific Mining, CITIC Pacific Special Steel, Dah Chong Hong Holdings Limited and CITIC Telecom International. DCH Holdings is a distributor of motor vehicles, food and consumer products. CITIC Telecom International owns and operates a telecoms hub that provides interoperability, interconnections and value-added services.

On 3 March 2011, CITIC Pacific announced its results for the full-year ended 31 December 2010. Profit attributable to shareholders was HK$8,915 million, the second highest in CITIC Pacific's history. The increase in profit was also driven by the gains from special steel business and sales of assets, which totalled HK$3,008 million.

The Sino Iron project is being developed by CITIC Pacific Mining, a wholly owned subsidiary of CITIC Pacific. It is located at Cape Preston, 100 kilometres southwest of Karratha on the coast of Western Australia's North Western region of the Pilbara. The Sino Iron project will mine magnetite iron ore that once processed, can be exported for use in the steelmaking process, where it is a desirable quality product for steel mills, including those of CITIC Pacific in China.

The Sino Iron project is intended to help satisfy demand from China's steelmaking industry by providing a reliable source of high quality iron concentrate. The products from the Sino Iron project will not only be used in CITIC Pacific's special steel mills in China, but also in other Chinese steel mills. One of the advantages of magnetite concentrate is its high iron content and low impurities compared to traditional iron ore products.

The project was conceived in 2006 with a total cost of under $2 billion. However costs by 2012 had reached $7.1 billion, leading to disputes among the partners of the project. In July 2012, with production due to begin within weeks, the budget was increased further to US$8 billion. The increase was attributed to lengthy delays, cost overruns, the rising Australian dollar, labour shortages and the introduction of the carbon and mining taxes.

As one of CITIC Pacific's main businesses, CITIC Pacific Special Steel is the largest manufacturer dedicated to the production of special steel in China with two operating steel plants – Xingcheng Special Steel and Xin Yegang. Through expansion, the company's annual steel producing capacity increased to eight million tonnes at the end of 2010. This will grow to nine million tonnes by the end of 2011. The two steel plants are ideally located to cover the main markets for special steel in eastern and central China. Major products include the following categories: bar steel, wire steel, mid to thick wall seamless steel tubes, special steel plates and special forging steel. These are widely used in various industries, including auto components, machinery manufacturing, oil and petrochemicals, transportation, energy, railways and shipbuilding.

On the property line of business, most of CITIC Pacific's properties are large-scale projects with locations in mainland China. These include Shanghai's Lu Jia Zui New Financial District project, the Sichuan Beilu Station and The Centre in Jiading, which form part of the city's new railway transport system. Zhujiajiao New Town in Shanghai and Noble Manor in Yangzhou are large-scale residential developments offering comprehensive community facilities. Our Shenzhou Peninsula project on Hainan Island will benefit from the government's plan to promote the island as an international tourism destination.

History

2008 Foreign exchange losses controversy 
In October 2008, the chairman Larry Yung disclosed that the firm lost HK$15 billion (US$2 billion) due to "unauthorized trades". The unauthorised trades were hedges with a contract value of A$9 billion against the Australian dollar, taken out to cover against a A$1.6 billion prospective acquisition and capital expenditure. Losses were incurred on the contracts when the currency declined from 98.5% against the US dollar to less than 70%. Its parent company, CITIC Group pledged its support to this subsidiary.

The board became aware of this on 7 September 2008, and disclosure was made to the financial markets after trading in its shares was suspended on 20 October. The company and the Hong Kong Securities and Futures Commission faced questions by legislators about the severe delays in their disclosure, considering the company made a pursuant to a proposed acquisition, that as at 9 September 2008, "the Directors are not aware of any material adverse change in the financial or trading position of the Group since 31 December 2007". When the shares resumed trading, the share price had fallen by some 75% since the previous close.

As a result of the revelations, two officers were forced to resign in disgrace. Due to her involvement in the loss, the chairman's daughter was demoted. The chairman claimed his daughter Frances Yung had not informed him about the situation before its discovery. Managing director Henry Fan temporarily stepped down from the Executive Council and the chairmanship of the Mandatory Provident Fund Schemes Authority, and all other major public positions he held with effect 24 October 2008.

On 3 April 2009, trading in CITIC Pacific shares was once again suspended, and the Hong Kong Police searched the company's office as part of an investigation into whether the company directors had made false statements about the foreign-exchange contracts, as well as company announcements made between July 2007 and March 2009, or had conspired to defraud. On 8 April, chairman Larry Yung resigned, citing the effect of the Commercial Crimes Bureau's visit to the company on public opinion; managing director Henry Fan resigned at the same time. They were replaced by Chang Zhenming, the Chairman of the CITIC Group.

Recent history
CITIC Pacific bought most of the assets from the parent company and issue new shares to the parent, making most of the assets of CITIC Group were listing in a stock exchange. However, CITIC Group still retained the stake in CITIC Guoan Group.

In 2014 the name of the company was also changed from CITIC Pacific Limited to just CITIC Limited.

On 20 January 2015, the Japanese general trading company Itochu and its Thai cross-shareholding affiliate Charoen Pokphand announced an investment of approx. HK$80 billion (US$10.4 billion) in CITIC Limited, the largest investment ever made by a Japanese general trading company. The transaction is also the largest acquisition in China by a Japanese company, and the largest investment by foreigners in a Chinese state-owned enterprise.

The deal saw Chia Tai Bright Investment, a 50–50 joint venture of Itochu and Charoen Pokphand, acquire a 10% stake of CITIC Limited from CITIC Group for HK$34.4 billion (US$4.54 billion), as well as subscribing new convertible preferred shares for HK$45.9 billion (US$5.9 billion). Before the deal, CITIC Group owned 77.90% stake, with National Social Security Fund owned an additional 5.00%, making only 17.1% shares of CITIC Limited were actually free float at 31 December 2014. The company also had HK$13.834 billion perpetual capital securities at 31 December 2014.

On 9 January 2017 the consortium of CITIC Limited, private equity funds of CITIC Capital and Carlyle, bought 80% stake of the franchise rights of McDonald's in Hong Kong and mainland China, for a total consideration of up to US$2.08 billion. CITIC Limited and CITIC Capital would own 52% stake collectively (via an intermediate holding, Fast Food Holdings in a 61.54–38.46 ratio, indirectly owned 32% and 20% stake respectively), while Carlyle would own 28% separately. 20% stake would be retained by McDonald's via Golden Arches Investments Limited (the trading name of McDonald's Hong Kong). In January 2020, CITIC invited other investors to buy most of their stake in the aforementioned Fast Food Holdings.

See history of CITIC Pacific Special Steel Holdings.

Subsidiaries
 CITIC Trust (100%)

Equity investments
 Beijing Sinobo Guoan F.C. (36%)
 AsiaSat (37.22% via a joint venture)

References

External links
 
 

Companies listed on the Hong Kong Stock Exchange
CITIC Group
Power Corporation of Canada
Itochu
Charoen Pokphand
1990 establishments in Hong Kong